The Allegheny Mountain dusky salamander (Desmognathus ochrophaeus) is a species in the Plethodontidae (lungless salamander) family.
It is found in the eastern United States, in the Niagara Glen Nature Reserve adjacent to the lower Niagara River in southern Ontario, and in southern Quebec, Canada.
Its natural habitats are temperate forests, rivers, intermittent rivers, freshwater springs, and rocky areas.

Description
Desmognathus ochrophaeus is a medium-sized salamander that can grow to about 10 cm in length. Adults are brownish and can have a widely variable coloration pattern. Usually, it has a light stripe down the back, with a row of dark spots on the centre and flanked by dark pigments. As in all members of the genus, the hind legs are larger and stouter than the front legs. This species belongs to the "lungless salamander" family (Plethodontidae), whose adults must keep their skin moist to breathe. It is a somewhat terrestrial salamander that can be found under stones, logs, and bark near springs, streams, and other areas where the ground is saturated with water.

Protection
Ontario's Endangered Species Act, 2007, protects D. ochrophaeus from being killed, harmed, or possessed. Salamanders are protected on Niagara Parks Commission property under the Niagara Parks Act, which makes it illegal to hunt, trap, or molest any animal without a government permit. A Dusky Salamander Recovery Team has been established to develop a strategy for the recovery of this species and the related Northern dusky salamander (D. fuscus).

References

Further reading
Cope ED. 1859. On the Primary Divisions of the SALAMANDRIDÆ, with Descriptions of Two New Species. Proc. Acad. Nat. Sci. Philadelphia 11: 122-128. (Desmognathus ochrophæa, new species, p. 124).

Desmognathus
Amphibians of Canada
Amphibians of the United States
Fauna of the Northeastern United States
Fauna of the Southeastern United States
Ecology of the Appalachian Mountains
Cenozoic amphibians of North America
Extant Pleistocene first appearances
Pleistocene animals of North America
Pleistocene United States
Taxonomy articles created by Polbot
Amphibians described in 1859